Matthew Centrowitz may refer to

Matt Centrowitz, Sr., (born 1955), American distance runner
Matthew Centrowitz Jr. (born 1989), American distance runner, 2016 Olympic gold medalist and son of Matthew, Sr.